SM U-37 was one of the 329 submarines serving in the Imperial German Navy in World War I. 
U-37 was engaged in naval warfare and took part in the First Battle of the Atlantic.

Design
German Type U 31 submarines were double-hulled ocean-going submarines similar to Type 23 and Type 27 subs in dimensions and differed only slightly in propulsion and speed. They were considered very good high sea boats with average manoeuvrability and good surface steering.

The U-boat was armed with four  torpedo tubes, two fitted in the bow and two in the stern, and carried 6 torpedoes. Additionally U-37 was equipped in 1915 with two  Uk L/30 deck guns.
The boat's complement was 4 officers and 31 enlisted.

Summary of raiding history

References

Notes

Citations

Bibliography

External links

World War I submarines of Germany
1914 ships
Ships built in Kiel
U-boats commissioned in 1914
Maritime incidents in 1915
U-boats sunk in 1915
U-boats sunk by mines
German Type U 31 submarines
World War I shipwrecks in the English Channel